School District 71 Comox Valley is a school district on Vancouver Island in British Columbia, Canada. This includes the communities of Courtenay, Comox and Cumberland as well as the surrounding rural areas and the adjacent islands of Denman and Hornby.{"type":"FeatureCollection","properties":{"name":"School District 71 Catchment Area (2011)","created":"2019-12-31T20:37:40.100+01:00","modified":"2019-12-31T23:04:52.912+01:00","generated":"2019-12-31T23:04:54.036+01:00","version":-1,"metadata":""},"features":[{"type":"Feature","properties":{"id":"a_3132264900_4","path":"","name":"Line a_3132264900_4","stroke":"#000000","stroke-opacity":1,"stroke-width":2},"geometry":{"type":"LineString","coordinates":[[-125.233471,49.49046],[-125.51673,49.712977],[-125.497847,49.72008],[-125.487547,49.726961],[-125.494414,49.739221],[-125.529261,49.756414],[-125.547801,49.756414],[-125.547629,49.768611],[-125.540419,49.772491],[-125.551234,49.787123],[-125.535441,49.798648],[-125.52703,49.800088],[-125.524798,49.801529],[-125.52085,49.801307],[-125.52085,49.803191],[-125.517588,49.803191],[-125.518017,49.806348],[-125.508833,49.80657],[-125.508662,49.827338],[-125.507954,49.826991],[-125.506967,49.826991],[-125.506537,49.827434],[-125.505529,49.827697],[-125.504585,49.828237],[-125.503984,49.828264],[-125.502396,49.828818],[-125.50203,49.829399],[-125.50173,49.829855],[-125.500206,49.830104],[-125.499348,49.830686],[-125.49849,49.830852],[-125.497932,49.831599],[-125.497975,49.831904],[-125.497717,49.832139],[-125.497782,49.83243],[-125.497481,49.832873],[-125.497846,49.833468],[-125.497782,49.833772],[-125.497567,49.833938],[-125.497245,49.834201],[-125.497009,49.8347],[-125.496258,49.834921],[-125.495722,49.835558],[-125.495207,49.835613],[-125.495207,49.836056],[-125.49555,49.836526],[-125.496108,49.836803],[-125.496923,49.838464],[-125.496451,49.83935],[-125.486323,49.839294],[-125.486323,49.828859],[-125.423452,49.828831],[-125.423581,49.835862],[-125.388777,49.835668],[-125.388777,49.839294],[-125.383155,49.839488],[-125.383069,49.847957],[-125.403068,49.847984],[-125.403196,49.873243],[-125.365345,49.873409],[-125.364401,49.875345],[-125.359766,49.879963],[-125.363199,49.881622],[-125.364701,49.884664],[-125.358822,49.887457],[-125.361783,49.891438],[-125.361783,49.897493],[-125.356974,49.899677],[-125.359459,49.901446],[-125.356755,49.91217],[-125.355339,49.913634],[-125.351348,49.912418],[-125.341993,49.914159],[-125.342894,49.916453],[-125.339718,49.917171],[-125.335598,49.916011],[-125.333409,49.920487],[-125.322681,49.921565],[-125.320192,49.919962],[-125.301438,49.918912],[-125.296588,49.906863],[-125.304055,49.905537],[-125.303669,49.901943],[-125.300234,49.90175],[-125.295086,49.897216],[-125.293756,49.893346],[-125.293155,49.892185],[-125.295086,49.890747],[-125.289679,49.889807],[-125.288134,49.888701],[-125.284143,49.889061],[-125.282898,49.887429],[-125.282169,49.887761],[-125.281611,49.887872],[-125.281396,49.888369],[-125.28101,49.888314],[-125.280624,49.888203],[-125.279594,49.888839],[-125.278049,49.889365],[-125.276933,49.890028],[-125.276804,49.890498],[-125.276075,49.890637],[-125.275259,49.89036],[-125.274573,49.89036],[-125.273071,49.890664],[-125.272191,49.89007],[-125.271483,49.889932],[-125.270431,49.890167],[-125.269745,49.890167],[-125.269294,49.890332],[-125.2688,49.890291],[-125.266955,49.890858],[-125.26644,49.891383],[-125.266097,49.893816],[-125.26541,49.895254],[-125.264745,49.895862],[-125.263758,49.896235],[-125.263114,49.895876],[-125.262406,49.894839],[-125.26187,49.894258],[-125.261419,49.893927],[-125.260968,49.894092],[-125.260518,49.894507],[-125.259681,49.895585],[-125.258801,49.896415],[-125.257385,49.897106],[-125.256269,49.897092],[-125.255668,49.896898],[-125.254595,49.896069],[-125.253673,49.895406],[-125.252128,49.895032],[-125.250111,49.895544],[-125.249102,49.895447],[-125.248673,49.895143],[-125.247643,49.895337],[-125.246871,49.895433],[-125.245133,49.895005],[-125.244103,49.894645],[-125.240734,49.894092],[-125.238652,49.89289],[-125.237773,49.892641],[-125.237129,49.892835],[-125.236163,49.893263],[-125.23612,49.893747],[-125.236571,49.894258],[-125.23715,49.89477],[-125.237279,49.895641],[-125.236764,49.895889],[-125.236228,49.895793],[-125.235841,49.895254],[-125.234833,49.894797],[-125.234038,49.894825],[-125.233159,49.894991],[-125.232473,49.895516],[-125.231807,49.895986],[-125.230477,49.896014],[-125.228524,49.896733],[-125.226464,49.896802],[-125.224726,49.896207],[-125.224018,49.895793],[-125.224254,49.895226],[-125.22507,49.894756],[-125.226593,49.893954],[-125.227194,49.893],[-125.226937,49.892378],[-125.225477,49.891577],[-125.224598,49.890816],[-125.223954,49.889669],[-125.223825,49.888273],[-125.22316,49.887526],[-125.222516,49.887498],[-125.221486,49.887982],[-125.220521,49.888411],[-125.219491,49.888038],[-125.217667,49.886807],[-125.216873,49.886102],[-125.216508,49.884955],[-125.216165,49.884166],[-125.215306,49.883807],[-125.213998,49.884001],[-125.213289,49.884567],[-125.213053,49.885425],[-125.213332,49.886337],[-125.212581,49.887097],[-125.21168,49.88736],[-125.207217,49.887028],[-125.205844,49.887153],[-125.205071,49.887996],[-125.204728,49.888563],[-125.203719,49.888549],[-125.202689,49.887816],[-125.20241,49.887568],[-125.202625,49.887015],[-125.202389,49.886517],[-125.20108,49.886544],[-125.199106,49.886849],[-125.198248,49.886932],[-125.197261,49.886392],[-125.195995,49.885687],[-125.195823,49.884415],[-125.196016,49.88342],[-125.194321,49.882964],[-125.191102,49.882521],[-125.188613,49.882936],[-125.187605,49.882825],[-125.187433,49.88194],[-125.187433,49.880807],[-125.18709,49.880129],[-125.185781,49.879687],[-125.185073,49.87876],[-125.184429,49.878525],[-125.184128,49.87876],[-125.183571,49.879645],[-125.183163,49.879949],[-125.182347,49.879631],[-125.181661,49.879272],[-125.181232,49.878511],[-125.180588,49.876631],[-125.18033,49.876022],[-125.179193,49.875594],[-125.176082,49.875262],[-125.174751,49.875165],[-125.173035,49.874653],[-125.171683,49.873741],[-125.170589,49.872261],[-125.170288,49.871722],[-125.169237,49.871155],[-125.167971,49.870726],[-125.16516,49.870505],[-125.163143,49.87038],[-125.161834,49.86973],[-125.161555,49.869163],[-125.162735,49.866756],[-125.162292,49.865469],[-125.161148,49.864889],[-125.158509,49.864516],[-125.157007,49.864737],[-125.155119,49.865968],[-125.153338,49.866508],[-125.152007,49.866272],[-125.149282,49.866895],[-125.147051,49.868195],[-125.142845,49.868458],[-125.139347,49.869744],[-125.137352,49.869868],[-125.137008,49.869122],[-125.137008,49.868458],[-125.137373,49.868057],[-125.138189,49.867531],[-125.138232,49.867185],[-125.137996,49.866922],[-125.136086,49.866604],[-125.135206,49.866618],[-125.133447,49.867075],[-125.132824,49.867393],[-125.131966,49.867808],[-125.131279,49.867725],[-125.130786,49.867904],[-125.12967,49.868596],[-125.127889,49.868886],[-125.126301,49.868651],[-125.124928,49.86879],[-125.12319,49.869647],[-125.120679,49.871348],[-125.115894,49.872703],[-124.848274,49.878898],[-124.842438,49.872372],[-124.83497,49.862967],[-124.824842,49.845314],[-124.821409,49.837897],[-124.813427,49.82101],[-124.810337,49.815417],[-124.798063,49.794422],[-124.773773,49.761721],[-124.753174,49.738213],[-124.724678,49.709804],[-124.688972,49.6796],[-124.650863,49.649379],[-124.59473,49.612353],[-124.521259,49.561829],[-124.499115,49.546239],[-124.490703,49.540446],[-124.484867,49.531534],[-124.481262,49.522397],[-124.482292,49.510361],[-124.486403,49.492078],[-124.489665,49.477804],[-124.490352,49.466983],[-124.601416,49.467653],[-124.70201,49.467541],[-124.731364,49.474346],[-124.757628,49.475796],[-124.75677,49.44076],[-124.734111,49.440536],[-124.733939,49.404693],[-124.82286,49.404917],[-124.823031,49.419659],[-124.856505,49.419436],[-124.857364,49.425465],[-124.85908,49.425689],[-124.859252,49.433057],[-124.906115,49.432276],[-124.90869,49.42915],[-124.915213,49.426805],[-124.922938,49.430713],[-124.929461,49.430824],[-124.937529,49.427252],[-124.939418,49.428927],[-124.940619,49.428815],[-124.946456,49.430824],[-124.946971,49.431941],[-124.972548,49.431885],[-124.97272,49.44288],[-124.976969,49.442825],[-124.97684,49.445615],[-124.983535,49.445615],[-124.983792,49.452841],[-124.988985,49.452925],[-124.989199,49.451083],[-124.991946,49.451083],[-124.992075,49.452785],[-124.997353,49.452729],[-124.997439,49.45471],[-124.996023,49.454878],[-124.996066,49.456412],[-125.002632,49.456635],[-125.003104,49.458392],[-125.011129,49.458365],[-125.011301,49.461935],[-125.013962,49.461768],[-125.013876,49.464055],[-125.016794,49.463999],[-125.016622,49.465951],[-125.014047,49.46584],[-125.01379,49.469354],[-125.016966,49.469577],[-125.017052,49.471306],[-125.022373,49.471418],[-125.022201,49.474987],[-125.02512,49.474931],[-125.024948,49.480062],[-125.019626,49.480229],[-125.019712,49.485527],[-125.02203,49.485583],[-125.022201,49.491102],[-125.024862,49.491158],[-125.024776,49.492886],[-125.03602,49.492719],[-125.035848,49.489374],[-125.033274,49.489095],[-125.033359,49.485694],[-125.035848,49.485471],[-125.036192,49.483464],[-125.04117,49.483742],[-125.041513,49.481568],[-125.044174,49.481623],[-125.044174,49.48062],[-125.052929,49.480397],[-125.0531,49.476772],[-125.068807,49.476939],[-125.068893,49.478947],[-125.071297,49.478612],[-125.071554,49.480397],[-125.074215,49.480731],[-125.074301,49.484021],[-125.077047,49.484021],[-125.077391,49.487646],[-125.082455,49.487701],[-125.082283,49.491102],[-125.087948,49.491047],[-125.088034,49.493109],[-125.093269,49.493109],[-125.093527,49.501917],[-125.101251,49.50214],[-125.101595,49.503868],[-125.106745,49.503868],[-125.107345,49.511002],[-125.108633,49.511002],[-125.10786,49.514346],[-125.125627,49.514622],[-125.125799,49.518439],[-125.131121,49.518411],[-125.131464,49.522005],[-125.136657,49.522033],[-125.136785,49.52557],[-125.142193,49.525765],[-125.142364,49.529136],[-125.150003,49.529275],[-125.147729,49.521782],[-125.142021,49.521864],[-125.142191,49.511052],[-125.128157,49.510913],[-125.1282,49.509185],[-125.133822,49.509157],[-125.133822,49.502107],[-125.139358,49.502162],[-125.139358,49.503807],[-125.143521,49.503751],[-125.143607,49.504643],[-125.1491,49.504531],[-125.149357,49.50559],[-125.152061,49.505618],[-125.152061,49.506594],[-125.160644,49.506315],[-125.160773,49.508071],[-125.171759,49.507959],[-125.171673,49.499124],[-125.170214,49.499041],[-125.170343,49.49564],[-125.166266,49.495613],[-125.166352,49.490428],[-125.181716,49.490539],[-125.181887,49.491153],[-125.192316,49.491376],[-125.192316,49.494163],[-125.206778,49.494386],[-125.206778,49.491208],[-125.229824,49.491376],[-125.229781,49.490316],[-125.233214,49.490344]]}}]}

History 
The Comox Valley has a rich history of settlement, industrial development, and community growth.  School District 71 developed alongside this local history, operating schools to meet the needs of the Comox Valley community since the late nineteenth century.

The Comox School District was formed on July 30, 1870 while the area was still part of the Colony of Vancouver Island.  This new school district provided the legal foundation for the Comox North School which was the  Comox Valley's first official public school.  Over the next decades, settlement in the region continued to expand and a number of new schools were established.

School District 71 was formally created in 1946 and currently spans from Miracle Beach in the north to Denman and Hornby Islands in the south.  Until 1946, individual schools in British Columbia operated with their own set of trustees and governance structures under the provincial government.  A number of local school districts existed in the area that School District 71 now covers.

The school district now operates a number of schools with a variety of programs including French Immersion, trades and career training, Montessori, distributed learning, and Indigenous education programs.

Elected Board of Education (2018-2022) 
The school board is composed of seven trustees representing the urban and rural areas of the school district.  They are elected officials.

 Sheila McDonnell, Board Chair, Area A (Baynes Sound, Hornby & Denman Islands)
 Michelle Waite, Vice Chair, Area B (Lazo North)
 Tonia Frawley, Town of Comox
 Janice Caton, City of Courtenay
 Kat Hawksby, City of Courtenay
 Sarah Jane Howe, Village of Cumberland
 Cristi May Sacht, Area C (Puntledge - Black Creek)
{"type":"FeatureCollection","properties":{"name":"Current School District 71 Schools (2019)","created":"2020-01-01T03:51:26.762+01:00","modified":"2020-01-04T07:49:22.026+01:00","generated":"2020-01-04T07:49:25.563+01:00","version":-1,"metadata":""},"features":[{"type":"Feature","properties":{"id":"a_3132496340_4","label":"Hornby Island Community School","name":"Hornby Island Commun","path":""},"geometry":{"type":"Point","coordinates":[-124.663356,49.533602]}},{"type":"Feature","properties":{"id":"a_3132496340_15","label":"Denman Island Community School","name":"Denman Island Commun","path":""},"geometry":{"type":"Point","coordinates":[-124.815823,49.535811]}},{"type":"Feature","properties":{"id":"a_3132496340_26","label":"Royston Elementary School","name":"Royston Elementary S","path":""},"geometry":{"type":"Point","coordinates":[-124.950153,49.645083]}},{"type":"Feature","properties":{"id":"a_3132496340_37","label":"Cumberland Community School Campus","name":"Cumberland Community","path":""},"geometry":{"type":"Point","coordinates":[-125.034102,49.622022]}},{"type":"Feature","properties":{"id":"a_3132496340_48","label":"Arden Elementary School","name":"Arden Elementary Sch","path":""},"geometry":{"type":"Point","coordinates":[-125.023714,49.672452]}},{"type":"Feature","properties":{"id":"a_3132496340_59","label":"Courtenay Elementary School","name":"Courtenay Elementary School","path":""},"geometry":{"type":"Point","coordinates":[-124.998388,49.682158]}},{"type":"Feature","properties":{"id":"a_3132496340_70","label":"Nala'atsi Indigenous Education","name":"Nala'atsi Indigenous","path":""},"geometry":{"type":"Point","coordinates":[-124.99723,49.683144]}},{"type":"Feature","properties":{"id":"a_3132496340_81","label":"Lake Trail Middle School","name":"Lake Trail Middle Sc","path":""},"geometry":{"type":"Point","coordinates":[-125.010491,49.680888]}},{"type":"Feature","properties":{"id":"a_3135207525_12","label":"Ecole Puntledge Park Elementary School","name":"Ecole Puntledge Park","path":""},"geometry":{"type":"Point","coordinates":[-125.014597,49.683776]}},{"type":"Feature","properties":{"id":"a_3135207525_23","label":"School Board Office (SD71)","name":"School Board Office","path":""},"geometry":{"type":"Point","coordinates":[-125.00125,49.687163]}},{"type":"Feature","properties":{"id":"a_3135207525_61","label":"Georges P. Vanier Secondary School","name":"Georges P. Vanier Se","path":""},"geometry":{"type":"Point","coordinates":[-124.998204,49.70955]}},{"type":"Feature","properties":{"id":"a_3135207525_99","label":"Facilities Maintenance (SD71)","name":"Facilities Maintenan","path":""},"geometry":{"type":"Point","coordinates":[-124.999084,49.711937]}},{"type":"Feature","properties":{"id":"a_3135207525_110","label":"Glacier View Secondary Centre","name":"Glacier View Seconda","path":""},"geometry":{"type":"Point","coordinates":[-124.983312,49.703548]}},{"type":"Feature","properties":{"id":"a_3135207525_121","label":"Sandwick Technical School","name":"Sandwick Technical S","path":""},"geometry":{"type":"Point","coordinates":[-125.008579,49.720715]}},{"type":"Feature","properties":{"id":"a_3135207525_132","label":"Huband Park Elementary School","name":"Huband Park Elementa","path":""},"geometry":{"type":"Point","coordinates":[-124.985925,49.733976]}},{"type":"Feature","properties":{"id":"a_3135207525_143","label":"North Island Distance Education School","name":"North Island Distanc","path":""},"geometry":{"type":"Point","coordinates":[-125.026437,49.766144]}},{"type":"Feature","properties":{"id":"a_3135207525_154","label":"Miracle Beach Elementary School","name":"Miracle Beach Elemen","path":""},"geometry":{"type":"Point","coordinates":[-125.11922,49.856488]}},{"type":"Feature","properties":{"id":"a_3135207525_165","label":"Queneesh Elementary School","name":"Queneesh Elementary","path":""},"geometry":{"type":"Point","coordinates":[-124.973501,49.713449]}},{"type":"Feature","properties":{"id":"a_3135207525_176","label":"Airport Elementary School","name":"Airport Elementary S","path":""},"geometry":{"type":"Point","coordinates":[-124.913816,49.70998]}},{"type":"Feature","properties":{"id":"a_3135207525_187","label":"Valley View Elementary School","name":"Valley View Elementa","path":""},"geometry":{"type":"Point","coordinates":[-124.958684,49.700905]}},{"type":"Feature","properties":{"id":"a_3135207525_198","label":"Mark R. Isfeld Secondary School","name":"Mark R. Isfeld Secon","path":""},"geometry":{"type":"Point","coordinates":[-124.959328,49.703014]}},{"type":"Feature","properties":{"id":"a_3135207525_209","label":"Aspen Park Elementary School","name":"Aspen Park Elementar","path":""},"geometry":{"type":"Point","coordinates":[-124.945659,49.684831]}},{"type":"Feature","properties":{"id":"a_3135207525_231","label":"Ecole Robb Road Elementary School","name":"Ecole Robb Road Elem","path":""},"geometry":{"type":"Point","coordinates":[-124.930966,49.680197]}},{"type":"Feature","properties":{"id":"a_3135207525_252","label":"Brooklyn Elementary School","name":"Brooklyn Elementary","path":""},"geometry":{"type":"Point","coordinates":[-124.904681,49.686868]}},{"type":"Feature","properties":{"id":"a_3135220261_38","label":"Highland Secondary School","name":"Highland Secondary S","path":""},"geometry":{"type":"Point","coordinates":[-124.915578,49.688826]}}]}

Grade Structure (2018-2019) 

Elementary Schools (15):
K-5 (2)
K-6 (1)
K-7 (11)
K-9 (1)
Middle School (1):
6-9
Secondary Schools (3):
7-12 (1)
8-12 (2)
Alternate Schools (2): 
7-12 (1) - Glacier View Secondary Centre/Sandwick Technical School
10-12 (1) - Nala'atsi Alternate School
Distributed Learning (1): 
K-12 (1) - North island Distance Education

Current schools

Former Schools

Surplus Property

See also 

List of school districts in British Columbia

References 

Courtenay, British Columbia
71